Cardinal of Lorraine may refer to:

Jean, Cardinal of Lorraine (1498–1550)
Charles, Cardinal of Lorraine (1524–1574)
Charles of Lorraine (bishop of Metz and Strasbourg) (1567–1607)
Nicholas Francis, Duke of Lorraine, Cardinal 1626–34